Gambier may refer to:

 Uncaria gambir, a species of tropical shrub
 An astringent extract made from Uncaria gambir

People
 James Gambier (1723–1789), a British vice-admiral
 James Gambier, 1st Baron Gambier (1756–1833), a British admiral also known as Lord Gambier
 Maurice Gambier d'Hurigny (1912 - 2000), French sculptor

Places
 Gambier Islands, French Polynesia
 Gambier, a commune of French Polynesia in the archipelago of the Tuamotu Islands
 Gambier Islands (South Australia)
 Gambier Island, British Columbia, Canada
 Gambier, Ohio, USA
 Gambier, Bahamas, also known as Gambier Village

See also 
 Gambir (disambiguation)
 Mount Gambier (disambiguation)